Tillabery Airport  is an airport serving Tillabery, Niger.

See also
Transport in Niger

References

 OurAirports - Niger
   Great Circle Mapper - Tillabery
 Tillabery Airport
 Google Earth

External links

Airports in Niger